Silence 4 were a Portuguese band, formed in 1996, who mostly sung in English. They released two albums to high critical acclaim, Silence Becomes It (1998) and Only Pain Is Real (2000). The band never officially disbanded, but went on an undetermined hiatus from 2001 to 2013, when their members decided to reunite for a brief tour after Sofia Lisboa underwent cancer treatment. Lead singer David Fonseca is currently undertaking a solo career.

History

Formation
The band's genesis took place in 1995. After good feedback from showing some demo tapes to a music shop owner in Leiria, David Fonseca approached Sofia Lisboa with the idea of forming a band. That idea only materialized one year later, when both of them invited Rui Costa to the band — who suggested they turn off the amplifiers and play acoustic, in silence.

They won a 500,000 escudos (roughly 2500 euros) prize in a band festival, which was spent totally in making demos. When presenting these to labels, the answer was always the same: "Singing in English? No way!" Refusing to balk at the demand of recording totally in Portuguese, they ended up recording a cover of Erasure's A Little Respect, which was included in the compilation Sons de Todas as Cores (released in 1998), giving it massive airplay and good critical response.

Silence Becomes It
Polygram (now Universal) finally accepted to work with them, but with some restrictions: minimum budget (5 million escudos — 25 thousand euros), and they would only receive royalties after selling 10 thousand records. The resulting album was Silence Becomes It, which was certified platinum 5 times (over 200 thousand records sold), spending months on top of the Portuguese charts. A national tour ensued, with 90 concerts in 6 months. On December 18, the legendary Pavilhão Atlântico concert took place.

Only Pain Is Real
They kept touring in 1999, though with less concerts. Then came a period of absence, when they "escaped" to London. It was there, at the Ridge Farm Studio, that their second album, Only Pain Is Real, was born. The album was presented in Leiria, in 2000, and took 2 weeks to reach platinum certification. Then came another tour, with over 100 concerts in one year, ending with two unique concerts at the Coliseu dos Recreios in Lisboa, on December 19 and 20.

Members
 David Fonseca - lead vocals, guitar
 Sofia Lisboa - backing vocals
 Rui Costa - bass guitar
 Tozé Pedrosa - drums

Discography

Studio albums
 Silence Becomes It (1998)
 Only Pain Is Real (2000)

Live albums 
 Ao Vivo - Coliseu dos Recreios (2004)
SongBook Live 2014 (2014)

References

Portuguese musical groups
Golden Globes (Portugal) winners